The men's épée was one of seven fencing events on the fencing at the 1952 Summer Olympics programme. It was the eleventh appearance of the event. The competition was held from 27 July 1952 to 28 July 1952. 76 fencers from 29 nations competed. Nations were limited to three fencers each. The event was won by Edoardo Mangiarotti of Italy, the nation's fourth consecutive victory in the men's épée (passing France for most all-time). It was also the fourth consecutive year that Italy had at least two fencers on the podium in the event, as Edoardo's brother Dario Mangiarotti took silver. Bronze went to Oswald Zappelli of Switzerland. Zappelli and Edoardo Mangiarotti had faced each other in a barrage for silver and bronze medals in 1948, which Zappelli had won; the two men were the fifth and sixth to earn multiple medals in the event.

Background
This was the 11th appearance of the event, which was not held at the first Games in 1896 (with only foil and sabre events held) but has been held at every Summer Olympics since 1900.

Four of the 10 finalists from the 1948 Games returned: silver medalist Oswald Zappelli of Switzerland, bronze medalist Edoardo Mangiarotti of Italy, eighth-place finisher Émile Gretsch of Luxembourg, and tenth-place finisher Ronald Parfitt of Great Britain. Also competing was Dario Mangiarotti, Edoardo's elder brother, part of the silver medal 1948 Italian team who had to withdraw from the individual event due to injury (his replacement, Luigi Cantone, won gold in the individual competition). The Mangiarotti brothers had each won a World Championship since the London Games, Dario in 1949 and Edoardo in 1951 (making him the reigning World Champion coming into the 1952 Olympics). The 1950 World Champion, Mogens Lüchow of Denmark, also competed.

Australia, Guatemala, Ireland, Japan, the Soviet Union, Venezuela, and Vietnam each made their debut in the event. Belgium and the United States each appeared for the 10th time, tied for most among nations.

Competition format

The competition format was pool play round-robin, with bouts to three touches. Not all bouts were played in some pools if not necessary to determine advancement. Ties were broken through fence-off bouts ("barrages") in early rounds if necessary for determining advancement. Ties not necessary for advancement were either not broken (if at least one fencer had not finished all bouts in the round-robin) or broken first by touches received and then by touches scored. In the final, ties were broken by barrage if necessary for medal placement but otherwise first by touches received and then by touches scored.

Fencers from the four nations that reached the team event final received byes to the quarterfinals.

 Round 1: 8 pools of 8 fencers each. The top 4 fencers in each pool advanced to the quarterfinals.
 Quarterfinals: 5 pools between 8 and 9 fencers each. The top 4 fencers in each pool advanced to the semifinals. 
 Semifinals: 2 pools of 10 fencers each. The top 5 fencers in each pool advanced to the final.
 Final: 1 pool of 10 fencers.

Schedule

All times are Eastern European Summer Time (UTC+3)

Results

Round 1

The top 4 finishers in each pool advanced to round 2. Fencers from the four teams that advanced to the final of the men's team épée event received byes through round 1:
 Italy: Dario Mangiarotti, Edoardo Mangiarotti, and Carlo Pavesi
 Luxembourg: Léon Buck, Émile Gretsch, and Jean-Fernand Leischen
 Sweden: Per Carleson, Sven Fahlman, and Carl Forssell
 Switzerland: Paul Barth, Paul Meister, and Oswald Zappelli

Pool 1

Pool 2

Mourão and Meraz defeated Amaral in a three-way barrage for third and fourth place.

Pool 3

Pool 4

Przeździecki defeated Brooke in a barrage for fourth place.

Pool 5

Pool 6

Kearney defeated Soberón and de Paula in a three-way barrage for fourth place.

Pool 7

Bougnol defeated Camous, Skrobisch, and Kroggel in a four-way barrage for fourth place.

Pool 8

Dias and Fethers defeated Makler in a three-way barrage for third and fourth place.

Quarterfinals

The top 4 finishers in each pool advanced to the semifinals.

Quarterfinal 1

Quarterfinal 2

Quarterfinal 3

Dybkær defeated Barth in a barrage for fourth place.

Quarterfinal 4

Forssell defeated Delaunois and Berzsenyi in a three-way barrage for fourth place.

Quarterfinal 5

Sákovics and Zappelli defeated Fethers in a three-way barrage for third and fourth place.

Semifinals

The top 5 finishers in each pool advanced to the final.

Semifinal 1

Semifinal 2

Final

There was a three-way barrage for silver, bronze, and fourth place. D. Mangiarotti came out best in that barrage, followed by Zappelli and then Buck.

References

Fencing at the 1952 Summer Olympics
Men's events at the 1952 Summer Olympics